Viswanatham is a panchayat town in Virudhunagar district in the Indian state of Tamil Nadu.

Demographics
 India census, Viswanatham had a population of 22,121. Males constitute 50% of the population and females 50%. Viswanatham has an average literacy rate of 60%, higher than the national average of 59.5%: male literacy is 69%, and female literacy is 51%. In Viswanatham, 15% of the population is under 6 years of age.

References

Cities and towns in Virudhunagar district